Ochiryn Demberel (born 12 August 1963) is a Mongolian boxer. He competed in the men's light flyweight event at the 1988 Summer Olympics.

References

External links
 

1963 births
Living people
Mongolian male boxers
Olympic boxers of Mongolia
Boxers at the 1988 Summer Olympics
Place of birth missing (living people)
Light-flyweight boxers
20th-century Mongolian people